American singer and songwriter Marc Anthony has released 13 studio albums, 15 music videos and 49 singles. Anthony has sold more than 12 million albums worldwide.

Albums

Studio albums

Compilation albums

Live albums

Singles

Solo

Notes

Promo singles/Radio airplay songs

As featured artist

Songwriting credits

Notes
C"Ride on the Rhythm" reached #1 on the Billboard Dance/Club charts.
D"Vieja Mesa" peaked at #7 on the Billboard Latin Tropical Airplay charts.
E"Barco a la Deriva" peaked at #8 on the Billboard Latin Tropical Airplay charts.
F"Amigo" peaked at #4 on the Billboard Latin Tropical Airplay charts.
G"Volando Entre Tus Brazos" peaked at #11 on the Billboard Latin Tropical Airplay charts.
H"El Día de Mi Suerte" peaked at #28 on the Billboard Latin Tropical Airplay charts.

References

Discography
Discographies of American artists
Latin pop music discographies
Tropical music discographies